Mouriès is a commune in the Bouches-du-Rhône department in southern France.

Population

Economy

Mouriès is known for its olive oil production, calling itself "the olive oil capital of France" (a claim disputed by Nyons, further north).  There are still two working olive oil mills in town, including one which allows tours.  In December of every year there is a festival celebrating the end of the harvest and the new oil, with a small parade and the benediction of the oil, along with various markets.

Wednesday is market day. The small tourism office in town supplies a list of all of the market days in the area. In winter the market here is much larger than in the other towns in the area (Maussane, Aureille or Eygalières).

Sights
The town sits on an old Roman road, and there has been a settlement here since the Celto-Ligurian days. The old oppidum built by the Ligures is still visible on the Caisses de Jean-Jean at the eastern end above the golf course.

Transportation
A bus connects the town with Arles to the west and Salon-de-Provence in the east.

See also
 Alpilles
 Communes of the Bouches-du-Rhône department

References

External links
 Tourism office website
 Webpage about Mouriès 
 Bus schedule 

Communes of Bouches-du-Rhône
Bouches-du-Rhône communes articles needing translation from French Wikipedia